Richard Bartholomew, Bartilmewe or Bartilmoes (by 1455 – c. 1525 or later), of Salisbury, Wiltshire, was an English politician.

Career
Bartholomew was a wealthy merchant and Mayor of Salisbury in 1487 and 1507.

He was elected a Member (MP) of the Parliament of England for Salisbury in 1497, 1512 and 1515.

Family
By 1481, he was married to a woman named Margery. They had five sons, including John and Richard, both merchants who predeceased their father.

References

 

15th-century births
16th-century deaths
English MPs 1497
English MPs 1512–1514
English MPs 1515
15th-century English businesspeople
16th-century English businesspeople
Mayors of Salisbury